Donald is a census-designated place and unincorporated community in Yakima County, Washington, United States. The population was 91 at the 2010 census.

Donald was founded in 1910 and was named after George Donald, an early railroad pioneer and the president of the North Yakima and Valley Railway Company. The town site, primarily a rural railroad junction, was acquired from George Donald by the railroad. Donald is located near the city of Wapato and is largely an agricultural community.

References

Northern Pacific Railway
Unincorporated communities in Yakima County, Washington
Unincorporated communities in Washington (state)
Census-designated places in Washington (state)
Census-designated places in Yakima County, Washington